HMS Shannon was a  steam frigate of the Royal Navy.

She was originally ordered as a sail driven Leander-class frigate,. but was re-ordered as screw frigate on 4 April 1851. She was built at Portsmouth Dockyard and launched on 24 November 1855. She was completed by 29 December 1856 with her hull having cost £62,759, her machinery £37,325, and a further £27,079 spent on fitting out.

Under the command of Sir William Peel, Shannon played an important role in the Indian Mutiny landing a naval brigade which fought at the Siege of Lucknow, including the Storming of the Sikandar Bagh.  Five Victoria Crosses were won by the following crew of HMS Shannon: Lieutenant Thomas Young, Lieutenant Nowell Salmon, Leading Seaman John Harrison, Able Seaman Edward Robinson and Able Seaman William Hall, the first Black person and the first Canadian sailor to be awarded a Victoria Cross. Peel was wounded in the leg during the second relief of Lucknow, and was brought to Cawnpore, where he died of smallpox, having commanded Shannons naval brigade during the campaign.

Captain George Alexander Waters took temporary command while Peel led the naval brigade, before taking permanent command until 1861.

Shannon was sold to Castle on 31 May 1871 to be broken up.

Notes

References
 
 
 "Mid Victorian RN Vessels", William Loney RN

External links
 

Liffey-class frigates
1855 ships
Ships built in Portsmouth